Csanád was an administrative county (comitatus) of the Kingdom of Hungary. Its territory is now part of Hungary, except for a small area which is part of Romania. The capital of the county was Makó.

Geography

Csanád county shared borders with the Hungarian counties of Csongrád, Békés, Arad and Torontál. The river Maros (Mureș) formed its southern border. Its area was 1,714 km2 around 1910.

History

The county's territory became part of the Kingdom of Hungary in the first half of the 11th century when Stephen I of Hungary defeated Ajtony, the local ruler. The county got its name after the commander of the royal army, Csanád. The king appointed Gerard of Csanád as the first bishop of Csanád. The county was initially much larger and included territories of the later Temes, Arad, and Torontál counties. The first seat of the county was Csanád (present-day Cenad, Romania).

The county's territory became part of the Ottoman Empire in the 16th century. The settlement structure was almost completely destroyed during the Ottoman-Habsburg wars. In the Treaty of Karlowitz, the Ottoman Empire renounced its claims to the territories north of the Maros (Mureș) river. Csanád county was reorganized in the returned territories (with greatly reduced size than in medieval times). Makó became the seat of the reorganized county.

After World War I, the county was occupied by the Romanian army. In 1920, the Treaty of Trianon assigned a small area in the southeast of the county (the town of Nădlac and the villages of Șeitin, Turnu and Dorobanți) to Romania. The rest of the county was united with parts of Torontál county (a small area south of Szeged) and Arad county (a small area south of Békéscsaba) to form the new county of Csanád-Arad-Torontál in 1923.

After World War II, the county was recreated, but in 1950 it was divided between the Hungarian counties of Békés and Csongrád (since 4 June 2020, the latter was renamed to Csongrád-Csanád County). The Romanian part of the former Csanád county is now part of Arad County.

Demographics

Csanád county was one of the most densely populated counties of the Kingdom of Hungary. The Hungarians formed an ethnic majority in every district except for the district of Nagylak. The main part of the Slovaks lived in the district of Nagylak, the Romanians lived mostly in the districts of Nagylak and Battonya, while the Serbs lived in the district of Battonya.

Subdivisions

In the early 20th century, the subdivisions of Csanád county were: 

The town of Nădlac is now in Romania; the other towns mentioned are now in Hungary.

Notes

References

External links
Heraldry 

States and territories established in 1699
States and territories established in 1790
States and territories established in 1860
States and territories established in 1945
States and territories disestablished in 1552
1786 disestablishments
States and territories disestablished in 1853
States and territories disestablished in 1920
States and territories disestablished in 1923
States and territories disestablished in 1950
Counties in the Kingdom of Hungary
States and territories established in the 11th century